The EPTV Group has the broadcast rights of the Algerian Ligue Professionnelle 1 since independence.
Number of Algerian private channels offer special league programs and highlights: El Heddaf, Echourouk, Dzair, El Djazairia One, El Bilad TV, Beur TV and Ennahar.

Several global channels has transferred previous Algerian league seasons such as the Saudi Arabia network ART, the French Channel Canal+ Maghreb, the Qatari network beIN Sports Arabia and the Qatari network Al-Kass Sports.

On 12 September 2003, ART acquired the rights to broadcast matches of the Algerian Championnat National (D1), ART broadcast up to three games per week, live or deferred, under the terms of the contract signed in Beirut, on the sidelines of the ceremony of the draw of the Arab Club Champions Cup, between ENTV, ART, and the Algerian Football Federation. The contract extended 6 years until the closure of ART sports channel due to financial problems.

On 28 September 2010, Canal+ Maghreb bought the rights to broadcast the first professional league season with a contract of one year. Canal+ Maghreb held the rights to broadcast 1 game per week, scheduled on Saturday. The agreement concerned only Canal + Maghreb and not Canal + France, which means that only subscribers of this package living in Algeria can watch the games. The contract was canceled before its end due to a disagreement between ENTV and Canal+ Group.

On 22 August 2014, beIN Sports Arabia bought the rights of broadcasting the 2015–16 season with an average of 1 game per week. The contract extended until the end of 2017–18 season.

Qatari channels Al-Kass Sports broadcast 10 meetings per season, most of them derby matches, from the 2015–16 to 2019–20 season.

The beginning of the 2016–17 season, Algerian television looked in the transfer of five matches on live per round for the first time on the four channels TV1 HD, Canal Algérie HD, TV6 HD and TV Tamazight 4 HD.

International broadcasters

Live games

Highlights only

References

Association football on television
broadcasters